The Grès à Voltzia is a geologic formation in France. It preserves fossils dating back to the Triassic period.

See also

 List of fossiliferous stratigraphic units in France

References
 

Triassic France
Triassic System of Europe
Anisian Stage